The First Corps was one of seven units of the Army of the Republic of Bosnia and Herzegovina established in 1992, in the early part of the Bosnian War.

History
The 1st Corps of the Army of the Republic of Bosnia and Herzegovina was solely established to defend Sarajevo and some part of the Sarajevo region. In 1997–1998, the 1st, 3rd and 7th Corps were incorporated into the 1st Corps of the Army of the Federation of Bosnia and Herzegovina.

1st Corps Operational Zone
The First Corps was responsible for the zone of Sarajevo during the war with the Bosnian Serb and Croat forces and its headquarters were established in Sarajevo. The First Corps had the assignment of protecting the Sarajevo, Gorazde zone from the opponents.

Command and Commanders
1st Commander - Mustafa Hajrulahović Talijan
2nd Commander - Vahid Karavelić
3rd Commander - Nedžad Ajnadžić
Deputy Commander: Ismet Dahić
Deputy Chief of Staff: Ismet Alija (1992–1993)
Deputy Chief of Staff: Esad Pelko (1993–1995)

Organization 1992–1994
From 1992 to 1994: These brigades were later renamed in the 3-number series.
1st Motorized Brigade
1st Mountain Brigade
2nd Motorized Brigade
2nd Mountain Brigade
3rd Motorized Brigade
5th Infantry Brigade
9th Mountain Brigade
Commander: Nezir Kazić
9th Motorized Brigade
Deputy Commander: Ramiz Delalić "Ćelo"
10th Mountain Brigade
1st Commander: Mušan Topalović
11th Infantry Brigade
12th Infantry Brigade
15th Motorized Brigade
105th Motorized Brigade
HVO Brigade "Kralj Tvrtko"
Artillery Brigade

Organization 1995
In January 1995 all Corps operational Groups were transformed into divisions and each division contained numerous brigades, further divided into battalions and detachments and specialized units.

12th Division (Sarajevo)
101st Mountain Brigade, HQ Sarajevo-Mojmilo
102nd Motorized Brigade, HQ Sarajevo-Stup
105th motorized Brigade, HQ Sarajevo-Kosevo
111th Vitezka Motorized Brigade, HQ Sarajevo-Zuc Hill
112th Vitezka Motorized Brigade, HQ Sarajevo-Rajlovac
115th Mountain Brigade, HQ Sarajevo-Bistrik
124th Light Brigade "King Tvrtko", HQ Sarajevo
152nd Mountain Brigade, HQ Vasin Han
155th Motorized Brigade, HQ Sarajevo-Dobrinja
14th Division
104th Vitezka Brigade, HQ Hrasnica
109th Mountain Brigade, HQ Pazaric
123rd Light Brigade, Bilalovac
131st Light Brigade, HQ Fojnica
181st Mountain Brigade, HQ Pazaric
182nd Vitezka Light Brigade, HQ Pazaric
16th Division
147th Light Brigade, HQ Vares
161st Slavna Olovo Mountain Brigade, HQ Olovo
162nd Mountain Brigade, HQ Vares
164th Mountain Brigade, HQ Breza
165th Mountain Brigade, HQ Visoko
185th Light Brigade, HQ Vares

Military Operations and Engagements
Siege of Sarajevo
Operation Neretva '93

See also

2nd Corps
3rd Corps
4th Corps
5th Corps
6th Corps
7th Corps

References
Armed Forces

Corps of the Army of the Republic of Bosnia and Herzegovina